The New York Blade was a free weekly newspaper focusing on lesbian, gay, bisexual and transgender (LGBT) issues in New York City, New York. The Blade was a member of the National Gay Newspaper Guild, and contained news, entertainment, classified ads, and free personals for men and women.

History 
The New York Blade was founded in 1997 as a New York edition of the Washington Blade.  The paper immediately came under fire from gay rights advocates because of indications that Wilbur Ross would be involved with the new venture.

The paper, along with the Washington Blade, was acquired by Window Media, LLC in 2001, and both were then sold to HX Media in 2007. Kat Long succeeded Trenton Straube as editor-in-chief in February 2009. The paper ceased publication in July 2009.

See also
 LGBT culture in New York City

References

External links
 LGBT Life with Full Text - Indexed and searchable in this EBSCO database that is available via libraries. 
 Smithsonian National Museum of American History, Archives Center - Lesbian, Gay, Bisexual,Transgender (LGBT) Collection

LGBT-related newspapers published in the United States
Defunct newspapers published in New York City
Newspapers established in 1997
Weekly newspapers published in the United States
Publications disestablished in 2009
LGBT history in New York City
1997 establishments in New York City
2009 disestablishments in New York (state)